Obertsrot is a village in Baden-Württemberg, Germany. It is administratively part of the town of Gernsbach in the Rastatt district.

Geography 

The village is located south of Gernsbach in the Murg Valley. The main settlement lies west of the Murg River.

History 
The first mention of Obertsrot is in a document from 1377, held in the State Archives in Karlsruhe. On April 1, 1970, Obertsrot merged with Hilpertsau to form the Obertsrot community, which was then incorporated into the town of Gernsbach on July 1, 1974.

Coat of Arms 
The Obertsrot coat of arms depicts two diagonally crossed pike poles with their tips turned outwards, with three red roses in between them. This design is ringed by a blue knotted rope.

References

Villages in Baden-Württemberg